Sri Keshav Rao Koratkar (1867 - 1932), was a pioneer of political, social, and educational reforms in Hyderabad State, India. Initially working on behalf of the Marathi people, he became involved in the Indian independence movement.

Early years and career
Keshav Rao Koratkar was born in a Deshastha Rigvedi Brahmin family in 1867 at Purjal Village in his maternal grandfather's house. He was one among the five sons of Santukarao, a Maharashtrian. At the age of nine, Keshavraoji left for his sister's house in Gulbarga where he started learning Urdu. He decided to pursue law as a career; in 1889 he passed both law and judiciary exams and started his law career at Hyderabad in 1896. A highlight of his law career was his appointments as the High Court Judge for the state of Hyderabad.

Community service
For over two decades Keshavrao was closely associated with the reform movement of Arya Samaj in Hyderabad. He was the President of Hyderabad Samajik Sudhar Sangh, a social reform organization. In 1907, he was instrumental in starting a school with Marathi as the language of instruction for the large local Marathi speaking community at Residency Bazar. He was also actively involved in starting a school in Gulbarga with his friend Sri Vittalrao Davulgavkar. He started a Marathi library in 1920 in Hyderabad and inspired the Mararastrian youth. He was instrumental in starting a Marathi monthly magazine named Rajhansa.

Indian Independence Movement
Keshavrao was influenced by his friend Bal Gangadhar Tilak, and on his request in 1897 he helped the Chapekar brothers of Pune, who were in hiding, seek medical help in Hyderabad. He became a part of the Khilafat movement. Although mainly a Muslim religious movement, it became a part of the wider Indian independence movement. In 1919 Keshavrao missed his daughter's wedding to lead the Khilafat Movement rally, an incident which exemplified his commitment to cause over family.

Final years
Keshavrao's final years were marked by ill health due to undiagnosed diabetes and impaired vision. On 20 May 1930, he went into diabetic coma, and breathed his last on 21 May 1930.

His son Shri Vidyalankar V. K. Koratkar is also Member of Hyderabad and Bombay Legislature and Lok Sabha.

References
 http://www.maharashtra.gov.in/english/gazetteer/Nanded/his1.html - 316k
 http://www.maharashtra.gov.in/english/gazetteer/VOL-II/REVOLUTIONARY_I.pdf
 http://www.epw.org.in/epw/uploads/articles/9232.pdf
 Pernau-Reifeld Margrit :Reaping the Whirlwind. Nizam and the Khilafat Movement,: Economic and Political Weekly, Vol 34, pp 2745–51
 Benichou Lucien D:From Autocracy to Integration: Political Developments in Hyderabad State,Orient Longman 2000 p. 33:

Notes

1867 births
1920 deaths